The Mirchi Music Award for Female Vocalist of The Year is given yearly by Radio Mirchi as a part of its annual Mirchi Music Awards for Hindi films, to recognise a female vocalist who has delivered an outstanding performance in a film song.

Superlatives

List of winners

See also
 Mirchi Music Awards
 Bollywood
 Cinema of India

References

Mirchi Music Awards